Crystal Secondary School is a school in the Western Cape.

Crystal Secondary School was founded in 1972 and named after the daughter of its first principal, the late C. R. Fortuin. Its motto is Facta Non Verba (Deeds Not Words). According to the school's website, "[d]uring the 70’s the learners of this school were in the forefront of the struggle."

References

External links
 

Schools in Cape Town
1972 establishments in South Africa
Educational institutions established in 1972